Petar Stanišić (Cyrillic: Петар Станишић; born 23 September 1984) is a Montenegrin retired football midfielder who last played for FK Mornar in the Montenegrin First League.

References
 Profile at HLSZ
 Profile and stats at Srbijafudbal

1984 births
Living people
People from Bačka Topola
Association football defenders
Serbia and Montenegro footballers
Montenegrin footballers
FK TSC Bačka Topola players
FK Crvenka players
FK Spartak Subotica players
OFK Petrovac players
FC Kairat players
Nyíregyháza Spartacus FC players
Szolnoki MÁV FC footballers
FK Mornar players
Montenegrin First League players
Kazakhstan Premier League players
Kazakhstan First Division players
Nemzeti Bajnokság I players
Montenegrin expatriate footballers
Expatriate footballers in Kazakhstan
Montenegrin expatriate sportspeople in Kazakhstan
Expatriate footballers in Hungary
Montenegrin expatriate sportspeople in Hungary